State Highway 38 (SH-38) is a state highway that spans  east-west in Oneida County in the southeast Idaho, United States from Holbrook east to Interstate 15 (I-15) in Malad City.

Route description

SH-38 begins at an intersection with North Holbrook Road and Stone Road in Holbrook. (From the western terminus of SH-38 the North Holbrook Road continues northwest to the Power County line and the southern terminus of Idaho State Highway 37.) From its western terminus, SH-38 heads east through a rural area between sections of the Curlew National Grassland. It takes a more crooked route east outside of Holbrook, intersecting Arbon Valley Road. After passing through the mountains, SH-38 enters a rural area and passes through the community of Pleasantview. The highway turns northeast toward Malad City, passing the Malad City Airport. After entering Malad City, the route turns eastward, passing through a mixed residential and business district. SH-38 leaves the Malad City limits before reaching its eastern terminus at Exit 13 of I-15. Immediately beyond I-15 is the road which was formerly U.S. Route 191.

History
Between 1927 and 1937, the SH-38 designation was assigned to a route (which, by 1927, had been previously designated as SH-32) that began in Roy and headed east and then northeast to Arbon, north to Pauline (along what is now the Arbon Highway) and then (along what is now the Bannock Highway) north to Crystal, and on to terminate in at the former routing of US-91 in Portneuf.

The route which is now SH-38 was marked as part of former routing of SH-33 by 1927. Between 1927 and 1937, SH-33 was changed to SH-37. (By 1927 the north-south route through Malad City was designated as SH-21, but by 1937 it had been changed to SH-36.) By 1956, the southern terminus of SH-38 had changed from SH-37 in Roy to SH-37 east of Holbrook (via Buist to Arbon) Eventually, the routing of SH-38 was changed to its current route, with the roads through Buist, Arbon, and Crystal to Portneuf being entirely removed from the state highway system.

Major intersections

See also

 List of state highways in Idaho
 List of highways numbered 38

References

External links

 Idaho Transportation Department Route 38 Mileage Log
 Idaho Transportation Department Reports on ID 38

038
Transportation in Oneida County, Idaho